"Too Much of Nothing" is a song written by Bob Dylan in 1967, first released by him on the album The Basement Tapes (1975).

Themes and history of song
One of the most haunting themes of The Basement Tapes is an apprehension of the void. Biographer Robert Shelton hears in this song an echo of the bald statement that Shakespeare's Lear makes to his daughter Cordelia, "Nothing will come of nothing" (King Lear, Act I, Scene 1). Marcus asserts that this was one of the songs recorded at the end of "the basement summer" in August or September 1967. He writes that these songs "are taken slowly, with crying voices. Dylan’s voice is high and constantly bending, carried forward not by rhythm or by melody but by the discovery of the true terrain of the songs as they’re sung. Richard Manuel’s and Rick Danko’s voices are higher still, more exposed."

Cover versions

By November 1967, this song was a Top 40 hit for Peter, Paul and Mary. According to Billboard, this version's "clever driving blues arrangement compliments the trio to the fullest."  Cash Box said that it is "blues in a folk manner with plenty of funk."  In Dylan's original, the chorus addresses two ladies—"Say hello to Valerie/Say hello to Vivien/Send them all my salary/On the waters of oblivion"—but Peter, Paul and Mary changed the second name to "Marion," displeasing Dylan. The trio's Paul Stookey speculated that this mistake may have caused Dylan to consequently became disenchanted with the group: "We just became other hacks that were doing his tunes." Patrick Humphries notes that, whether by accident or design, the chorus's two women originally named share the names of the two wives of the major 20th-century poet T. S. Eliot. Lachlan MacKinnon  writes that the lines do refer to Eliot's wives and are "remarkably shrewd", suggesting the poet's "strange combination of self-distancing and financial propriety". Peter, Paul and Mary's recording of the song was also included on their 1968 album Late Again.

This song also appeared on Spooky Tooth's debut album It's All About, and on Fotheringay's debut album, as well as Albert Lee's Black Claw & Country Fever sessions. All three versions substituted "Marion" for "Vivien".

Personnel
Bob Dylan – vocal, guitar
Robbie Robertson – electric guitar
Garth Hudson – organ
Richard Manuel – piano, backing vocal
Rick Danko – bass, backing vocal. 

Overdubbed 1975: 
Hudson – additional keyboards
Helm – (possibly) drums, backing vocal

Notes

References

External links 
 "Too Much of Nothing" – Lyrics reproduced on Dylan official website.

Bibliography

 
 
 
 
 
 

1967 songs
Songs written by Bob Dylan
Bob Dylan songs
1967 singles
Peter, Paul and Mary songs
Song recordings produced by Albert Grossman
Song recordings produced by Milt Okun
Warner Records singles